Emilio Comte (born 15 January 1941) is an Argentine film actor active between 1956 and 1998.

External links
 

1941 births
Living people
Argentine male film actors
Place of birth missing (living people)
20th-century Argentine male actors